Sir Henry Pollexfen (1632 – 15 June 1691) of Nutwell in the parish of Woodbury, Devon, was Lord Chief Justice of the Common Pleas.

Origins
According to Eliott-Drake (1911), he was the eldest son of Andrew Pollexfen (a younger grandson of John Pollexfen of Kitley in the parish of Yealmpton in Devon) of Stancombe Dawney in the parish of Sherford, Devon, by his wife, Joan Woollcombe, a daughter of John Woollcombe of Pitton in the parish of Yealmpton in Devon. Henry was the elder brother of John Pollexfen, MP, the political economist. This parentage differs from that given in the pedigree in the Heraldic Visitations of Devon (1895 edition), which therefore appears unreliable.

Career

He entered Inner Temple in 1652, was called to the bar in 1658 and by 1662 he was pleading before the high courts at Westminster Hall. In 1674 he became a bencher at Inner Temple, and was the leading practitioner on the western circuit, frequently pleading at the King's Bench. In 1676 he defended Stockbridge, Hampshire on a Quo warranto charge, which he lost. He frequently acted as counsel in various politically charged cases, and regularly lost; clients included the lords involved in the Popish Plot, the Earl of Danby and as one of many counsel for Edward Fitzharris, Stephen College and Algernon Sidney, all of whom were later executed. 

Along with Sir George Treby and Sir Francis Winnington he defended London on a second Quo warranto charge in 1683, arguing that Corporations could not be charged for the wrongdoing of individuals. He lost, and in 1684 was asked to take a similar case for Berwick-upon-Tweed, this time advising surrender.

In 1688 he was made a justice, and advised the House of Lords on the legality of Quo warranto seizures. After William III arrived in 1688 he was a close advisor, and helped persuade him to declare himself King, arguing that the throne was vacant due to James fleeing, saying James 'went away because the terror of his own conscience frighted him and he durst stay no longer'. 

William did not make himself King according to Pollexfen's advice, but in reward for his services Pollexfen was knighted and made Attorney General for England and Wales in March, and appointed Chief Justice of the Common Pleas on 6 May 1689. In late 1689 he was elected Member of Parliament representing Exeter at the 1689 Convention Parliament, where William was officially offered the crown.

Marriage and children

In 1664, aged 32, he married Mary Duncombe, a daughter of George Duncombe (d.1677) of Weston in the parish of Albury and of Shalford in Surrey, and sister of Sir Francis Duncombe, 1st Baronet (died 1670) of Tangley Park in Surrey, by whom he had issue one son (who died childless) and four daughters as follows:
Henry Pollexfen (d.1732), of Nutwell, son and heir, who married Gertrude Drake (1669-1729), a daughter of Sir Francis Drake, 3rd Baronet (1642-1718) of Buckland Monachorum in Devon, by his first wife Dorothy Bampfylde, a daughter of Sir John Bampfylde, 1st Baronet of Poltimore, Devon. He died childless, leaving his four sisters as his co-heiresses. Nutwell eventually passed to the Drake family, through his sister Elizabeth Pollexfen.
Mary Pollexfen (d.1722), who married John Buller (1668–1701) of Keverell in Cornwall, a member of parliament for Lostwithiel in Cornwall in 1701, only son and heir apparent of John Buller (1632–1716), MP, of Morval and of Shillingham near Saltash, both in Cornwall.
Elizabeth Pollexfen (d.1717), heiress of Nutwell, who in 1689 married (as his third wife) Sir Francis Drake, 3rd Baronet (1642-1718) of Buckland Monachorum, her brother's father-in-law. She was the mother of Sir Francis Drake, 4th Baronet (1694–1740).
Anne Pollexfen, who married George Duncombe of Shephill in Surrey, her mother's great-nephew;
Jane Pollexfen, who married Capt. Francis Drake (1668-1729), Royal Navy (first cousin of the 3rd Baronet), whose monument survives in St Andrew's Church in Plymouth.

Death
After serving as Chief Justice for two years Pollexfen died of a burst blood vessel at his home in Lincoln's Inn Fields on 15 June 1691.

Sources
Crossette, J.S., biography of Pollexfen, Henry (c.1632-91), of Woodbury, Devon and Lincoln's Inn Fields, London, published in History of Parliament: the House of Commons 1660–1690, ed. B.D. Henning, 1983 
Eliott-Drake, Elizabeth (Lady Eliott-Drake) (1840-1923) (née Douglas, a daughter of Sir Robert Andrews Douglas, 2nd Baronet of Glenbervie and wife of Sir Francis George Augustus Fuller-Eliott-Drake, 2nd Baronet (1837–1916) of Nutwell Court and Buckland Monachorum), Family and Heirs of Sir Francis Drake, Vol. II, London, 1911, pp. 55–9 ;

References

English MPs 1689–1690
Attorneys General for England and Wales
Knights Bachelor
Chief Justices of the Common Pleas
People associated with the Popish Plot
1632 births
1691 deaths
Members of the Inner Temple
17th-century English lawyers
Members of the Parliament of England (pre-1707) for Exeter